Mahomed Yusufovych Mameshev (born 17 January 2002) is a Ukrainian professional footballer who plays as a right winger for Ukrainian club Nyva Ternopil.

References

External links
 
 

2002 births
Living people
Footballers from Kyiv
Ukrainian footballers
Association football forwards
FC Nyva Ternopil players
Ukrainian First League players